Joseph Ma may refer to:

Ma Xiangbo (1840–1939), Chinese Roman Catholic priest and scholar
Joseph Ma Zhongmu (1919–2020), Chinese Roman Catholic bishop
Joseph Ma Xue-sheng (1923–2013), Chinese Roman Catholic bishop
Joseph Ma Yinglin (born 1965), Chinese Roman Catholic bishop

See also
Joe Ma (disambiguation)